Tony Williams (born July 9, 1975) is a former American football defensive tackle in the National Football League (NFL). He was drafted by the Minnesota Vikings in the fifth round of the 1997 NFL Draft. He played college football at Memphis.

Williams also played for the Cincinnati Bengals and Jacksonville Jaguars.

Professional career
Williams was drafted by the Minnesota Vikings in the fifth round of the 1997 NFL Draft. Williams spent the first four years with the Vikings. After the 2000 season he signed with the Cincinnati Bengals who he played for until 2004. Williams went un-signed for the 2005 season and was a free agent. Before the 2006 season he signed with the Jacksonville Jaguars but did not play in any games.

References

1975 births
Living people
American football defensive tackles
Cincinnati Bengals players
Jacksonville Jaguars players
Memphis Tigers football players
Minnesota Vikings players
People from Germantown, Tennessee